The Kershaw Sessions is the name of several albums based on sessions done for the radio DJ Andy Kershaw including:
 The Kershaw Sessions (Robyn Hitchcock album), an album by Robyn Hitchcock and the Egyptians released in 1994, comprising nineteen titles recorded live between 1985 and 1991
 The Kershaw Sessions: Live at the BBC, an album by Ted Hawkins released in 2000, comprising titles recorded live 1986–1989
 The Kershaw Sessions (Martin Carthy), an album by Martin Carthy released in 1994, comprising titles recorded live in 1987 and 1988